Chiloglanis micropogon is a species of upside-down catfish native to Cameroon, the Democratic Republic of the Congo and Angola, where it occurs in the lower Congo river, the Kasai, Kwango, Dja and Lualaba rivers and Wagenia Falls (Stanley Falls). It also occurs in the Rungumba River, a tributary of Lake Tanganyika in the Democratic Republic of the Congo. This species grows to a length of  TL.

References

External links 

micropogon
Catfish of Africa
Freshwater fish of Angola
Fish of Cameroon
Fish of the Democratic Republic of the Congo
Fish described in 1952